The Papo Seco Formation is a geological formation in Portugal, whose strata date back to the Early Cretaceous. Dinosaur fossils are among the fossils that have been recovered from the formation.

Name 
The unit was previously referred to as the "Gres a Dinosauriens", due to the abundant dinosaur remains found in the past.

Description 
The Papo Seco Formation (Rey, 1992) marks the return to clastic-dominated sedimentation. Exposure of the formation is found above the low cliff between Rochadouro and Areia do Mastro, and on the foreshore and beach at Boca do Chapim. The Papo Seco Formation is dominated by silty mud-mud deposition. This is interbedded with medium to coarse, commonly ribbon shaped, clastic sandstones. Along the exposure, between Rochadouro and Boca do Chapim, the clastic sands are not laterally continuous. The exposure clearly shows that the ribbon sands are isolated and change laterally into muds. Three distinct sand facies have been identified within the Papo Seco Formation.

Vertebrate paleofauna

Correlation

See also 
 List of dinosaur-bearing rock formations

References

Further reading 
 S. Figueiredo, I. Bachtsevanidou Strantzali, M. Gomes, R. Pimenta, and M. Santos. 2017. Preliminary Data of New Dinosaurs and Turtles Remains from the basal Deposits of the Papo-Seco Formation in Areias do Mastro's Quarry (Cabo Espichel - Portugal). Arnava 6(1):117-130

Geologic formations of Portugal
Lower Cretaceous Series of Europe
Cretaceous Portugal
Barremian Stage
Mudstone formations
Siltstone formations
Sandstone formations
Paleontology in Portugal